The Waltz Queen is an LP album by Patti Page, released by Mercury Records in 1958, under catalog number MG-20049 (though some references  do not confirm this number as it was used for a Sophie Tucker album), and later MG-20318  (monaural) and SR-60049 (stereophonic).

It was reissued by Universal Records in 2007 in compact disc form under catalog number 9349. It should not be confused with an album of the same name released by Mercury's Wing Records subsidiary in 1960 under catalog numbers MGW-12121 and SRW-16121, with all different songs.

The original mono of The Waltz Queen was issued under the title Waltzes Bring Memories with a different cover as MG-20049. It didn't sell so the new title and cover were created but the same catalog number used. The mono version in its original release included one image of the artist on the cover; in its reissue it featured two images of the artist, the same as the stereo version.

Billboard reviewed the album on March 17, 1958, saying: “Exceptionally strong packaging. The gal has never been better than in this creamy, nostalgic selection of three-beater favorites like “What’ll I Do,” “Till We Meet Again,” “The Boy Next Door”,” etc. Excellent backings by Vic Schoen and ork. Several bands here are worthy of singles exposure and the entire set should set a brisk pace at the counter.”

Track listing

Track listings are different for different pressings. The original pressings included "What'll I Do," "Memories," "Till We Meet Again," "Whispering Winds," "Remember," "Now Is the Hour," "You Always Hurt the One You Love," "The Boy Next Door," "Falling in Love with Love," "Let the Rest of the World Go By," "That's All I'll Ever Ask of You"  and "Wondering." Later pressings replaced "Whispering Winds" with "While We're Young."  "That's All I'll Ever Ask of You" was replaced by "You Will Find Your Love (in Paris)."

References

Patti Page albums
1955 albums
Mercury Records albums